Sipi Sipi (Aymara, also spelled Sipisipi) is a  mountain in the Bolivian Andes. It is located in the La Paz Department, Aroma Province, Patacamaya Municipality. Sipi Sipi lies southwest of Malla Jaqhi.

References 

Mountains of La Paz Department (Bolivia)